The Bank of America Center is the 23rd tallest building in Austin, Texas. It was built in 1975 and has  of office space on 26 floors. The tower was the second building in Austin to surpass the Texas State Capitol in height, after the Chase Bank Tower. The Bank of America Center was the tallest building in Austin for 9 years from 1975 to 1984, surpassing the Chase Bank Tower but falling short of the One American Center. The building's facade was built with leftover material from Pennzoil Place in Houston.

See also
List of tallest buildings in Austin, Texas

References

External links
T. Stacy & Associates page on the Bank of America Center

Bank of America buildings
Office buildings completed in 1975
Skyscraper office buildings in Austin, Texas
1975 establishments in Texas